The Sumter County Courthouse, built in 1907, is an historic courthouse located at 141 North Main Street in the city of Sumter in  Sumter County, South Carolina. It was designed in the Beaux Arts style by Darlington native William Augustus Edwards who designed eight other South Carolina courthouses as well as academic buildings at 12 institutions in Florida, Georgia and South Carolina. It was built in an I-shape. In the early 1960s it was enlarged and remodeled. On June 16, 2004, it was added to the National Register of Historic Places. It is located in the Sumter Historic District.

See also
List of Registered Historic Places in South Carolina
Sumter County Courthouse (disambiguation)

References

Gallery

External links 

 Sumter County website
 National Register listings for Sumter County
 South Carolina Department of Archives and History file on Sumter County Courthouse
 University of Florida biography of William Augustus Edwards
 

County courthouses in South Carolina
William Augustus Edwards buildings
Buildings and structures in Sumter County, South Carolina
Courthouses on the National Register of Historic Places in South Carolina
National Register of Historic Places in Sumter County, South Carolina
Historic district contributing properties in South Carolina